The  chestnut-capped brushfinch (Arremon brunneinucha), is a Neotropical passerine bird in the New World sparrow Passerellidae
 
Until recently, it was generally placed in the genus Buarremon, while it occasionally has been placed in Atlapetes.

Description
The chestnut-capped brushfinch is a large, robust, mainly terrestrial species, 19 cm long and weighing 45 g. It has a long slender bill and large feet and legs. The adult has a distinctive head pattern, with a yellow-edged chestnut crown and nape, black forehead and head sides, white spots in the centre and each side of the forehead, and a white throat which is often puffed up when the bird is excited. The upperparts are dark olive, with darker wings. The white central breast is separated from the white throat by a black band. The breast sides are grey, and the flanks and lower belly are olive-green. Young birds have a sooty-brown cap, sooty face and olive-brown upperparts, throat and breast.

The chestnut-capped brushfinch has a thin pink call and a very high-pitched psssst. The male's song consists of a mixture of whistles and sharper notes.

Distribution and habitat
This is a common bird in the undergrowth of wet mountain forests, second growth, and ravines at from 900 m to 250 m altitude. It breeds in highlands from central Mexico to south-eastern Peru.

Behaviour
The nest, built by the female, is a large cup of plant material placed less than 2.5 m up in a shrub or small tree in dense scrub or a ravine. The typical clutch is two glossy, unmarked white or pale blue eggs, which are incubated by the female alone for 12–14 days before hatching.

The chestnut-capped brushfinch feeds on insects and spiders extracted from the leaf litter with its bill, and will also pick berries and invertebrate prey from low bushes.  It is seen in pairs or family parties.

References

Further reading

chestnut-capped brush finch
Birds of Central America
chestnut-capped brush finch